Michelle Heimberg (born 2 June 2000) is a Swiss diver. She competed in the women's 1 metre springboard event at the 2019 World Aquatics Championships. She finished in 16th place in the preliminary round. In the women's 3 metre springboard event she finished in 28th place in the preliminary round.

References

External links
 

2000 births
Living people
Swiss female divers
Place of birth missing (living people)
Divers at the 2018 Summer Youth Olympics
Divers at the 2020 Summer Olympics
Olympic divers of Switzerland
Sportspeople from Aargau